Glen Dean is an unincorporated community in Breckinridge County, Kentucky, United States. Glen Dean had a post office until it closed on June 22, 1991.

The place name Glen Dean comes from the Scottish words glen, meaning a narrow valley, and dean, also meaning valley.

It has also been reported that Glen Dean was named for William Johnson Dean, who was the owner of 2,700 acres.

The last wild turkey in Breckinridge County was killed in the late 1800s near the site of the first Goshen Baptist Church, located in Glen Dean.

References

Unincorporated communities in Breckinridge County, Kentucky
Unincorporated communities in Kentucky